Oottyppattanam is a 1992 Malayalam-language comedy drama film directed by Haridas and starring Jayaram, Siddique, Jagathy Sreekumar, Easwari Rao, Narendra Prasad, Jayabharathi and Anju in pivotal roles.

Plot
Prince Rajasekharan is without an heir and decides to adopt a brave man from a royal family to inherit his property. He faces many challenges when several people turn up wanting to be adopted.

Cast
 Jayaram as Pavithran
 Siddique as Jimmy
 Jagathy Sreekumar as Basheer
 Easwari Rao as Seena/Ranjini Thampuratti
 Narendra Prasad as Rajasekhara varma
 Jayabharathi as Lakshmi/Rajasekhara Varma's wife
 Babu Namboothiri as Surya Namboothiri
 Mahesh Anand as Dharmaraj
 Augustine as Shinkaravelan 
 K. B. Ganesh Kumar as murdered prince Ramavarma
 Anju as deceased princess
 Janardhanan as Advocate
 Zainuddin as man arriving to be adopted 
 Mala Aravindan as driver
 Philomina as Narayani Amma
 Krishnankutty Nair as policeman

References

External links
 
 Oottyppattanam at the Mallumovies.org

1990s Malayalam-language films
Films scored by Johnson
1992 comedy-drama films
1992 films
Indian comedy-drama films